Sisko Heikkilä (23 December 1921 – 24 January 1997) was a Finnish athlete. She competed in the women's high jump at the 1952 Summer Olympics.

References

External links
 

1921 births
1997 deaths
Athletes (track and field) at the 1952 Summer Olympics
Finnish female high jumpers
Olympic athletes of Finland
People from Iitti
Sportspeople from Kymenlaakso